Quincy Adams Shaw, Jr. (July 30, 1869 – May 8, 1960) was a left-handed tennis player from the United States. 

Shaw won the NCAA Men's Tennis Championships in doubles for Harvard University in 1887 and 1890, and reached the Challenge Round in singles at the U.S. National Championships in 1889 (beating Oliver Campbell, then losing to Henry Slocum). He was among the top 10 American tennis players in 1887 and 1889.

Grand Slam finals

Singles (1 runner-up)

References

19th-century American people
19th-century male tennis players
American male tennis players
Harvard Crimson men's tennis players
1869 births
1960 deaths
Tennis people from Massachusetts